Paul Wright (Beeston, Nottingham) is an English professional racing cyclist, specialising in cyclo-cross and mountain bike racing. He was a member of the Ace Racing Team for cyclo-cross,  nationally  and internationally from 1995 until 2002. He also raced to Pro-Elite level in mountain bike racing winning numerous
titles in cross-country events. He currently races on the road events nationally and internationally to UCI 2.2 level.

Palmarès
1994
1st  TLI British National Cross Country Mountain Bike Championships 
2nd NEMBA Karrimor ELITE Final Downhill Championships "Press Result"

1995
3rd  TLI British National Cross Country Mountain Bike Championships

1997
1st  TLI British National Cross Country Mountain Bike Championships
1st  "Notts & Derby Cyclo-Cross League"
1st  British National Cyclo-cross Championships -Ace Racing Team

1998
1st  British National Cyclo-cross Championships -Ace Racing Team
3rd  TLI British National Cross Country Mountain Bike Championships

1999
1st  "Midland Team Cyclo-cross Champions (East Midlands Team)"
1st  British National Cyclo-cross Championships -Ace Racing Team

2000
12th  Tour De La Manche (FRA)  E2 (ROAD)
15th  Tour Du Bessin (FRA)  NAT 1 (ROAD)

2006
4th "UK East Midland State Divisional Road Race Championships" "British Cycling Report"
4th "XII Copa De Europa De Masters a Mallorca (Esp) European Road Race Championship Cup (ROAD)"

2007

1st "Plan B 2-Day Stage Race, Stage 2 UK (ROAD)"
1st "the first Tour De Oakey (Aus) (ROAD)"
2nd X "Vuelta a Mallorca (Esp) (Tour of Mallorca Stage 2 Felanitx-Felanitx) (ROAD)"
3rd "XIII Copa De Europa De Masters a Mallorca (Esp) (European Road Race Championship Cup (ROAD)"
11th FBD Insurance Rás"(IRE) (Tour of Ireland) UCI 2.2 Stage 7" Road"British Cycling Results" 

2014

2nd "XX Copa De Europa De Masters a Mallorca (Esp) (European Road Race Championship Cup (ROAD)"

References

"Cyclingnews.com" Stage 6 Photos
"Cyclingnews.com" Stage 7 Report
"Cyclingnews.com" The 1st Oakey Criterium
"1997-1998 Nottingham & Derby Cyclo-Cross Season" Final Overall Classification 
"1997-1998 Nottingham & Derby Cyclo-Cross Season" 1st Place Round 1

British Cycling On-Line Records
 "British Cycling Sources" from 2006 only

External links
 Tour Of Mallorca Official Site. "Vuelta a Mallorca Official Site"
 Rás Tour of Ireland Official Site. "FBD Insurance Rás"
 Rás Tour of Ireland British Cycling Report. "British Cycling Report"
 Rás Tour of Ireland Cycling News Report "Cycling News Report"
 SRAM Notts & Derby Cyclo-cross League "1997-8 Season listings"

Living people
Cyclo-cross cyclists
English male cyclists
People from Beeston, Nottinghamshire
Sportspeople from Nottinghamshire
Year of birth missing (living people)